Tor Folke René Nilsson (20 March 1919 – 13 April 1989) was a heavyweight Greco-Roman wrestler from Sweden who won a silver medal at the 1948 Summer Olympics.

References

External links
 

1919 births
1989 deaths
Olympic wrestlers of Sweden
Wrestlers at the 1948 Summer Olympics
Swedish male sport wrestlers
Olympic silver medalists for Sweden
Olympic medalists in wrestling
Medalists at the 1948 Summer Olympics
Sportspeople from Lund
20th-century Swedish people